Cornell is a new community village being developed in northeast Markham, Ontario and bounded by Highway 407, 16th Avenue, Ninth Line, and the Donald Cousens Parkway. The 2011 population of this area was 9,880. Adding Cornell North's 2,178 (from 16th Avenue to Donald Cousens Parkway) it had 12,058 residents.

History
Cornell was conceived in the 1990s planning process by the town of Markham. Unlike other Markham communities, Cornell is a planned community.

One of the original settlers was Christian Reesor. He and his family settled in Cornell. Their original homestead was on Reesor Road. The name 'Cornell' derives from the maiden name of the wife of Christian Reesor's youngest son, who continued to live at the family homestead.

William Cornell

Cornell's name was selected in 1999 from a suggestion by local lawyer Paul Mingay. Mingay's family roots can be traced back to Susan Emily Cornell, a descendant of William C. Cornell (1766-1860), settler from Rhode Island who came to Canada in 1799 (via Oswego, New York) and settled in Scarborough, Ontario in 1800. Later Cornells settled in Markham, Ontario and married into the Reesor family. William Cornell immigrated to Canada from Rhode Island and is a distant relative of Ezra Cornell, founder of Cornell University. Erza's great grandfather Elijah Cornell (1730-1777) was brother to William C. Cornell's great grandfather Gideon Cornell (1728-1817).

Heritage Buildings
A number of farm houses are found in Cornell built by settlers, their descendants or later landowners. Some are restored for reuse as homes, others re-purposed for non residential usage. Historic preservation is to the exterior only:

 41 Bittersweet Street - Roger Hawkins House c. 1875 by tenant farmer on Reesor land
 2665 Bur Oak Avenue - William Grant House c.1840 on former Beatty farmstead; now church facility
 8961 Ninth Line - Benjamin Marr House c. 1859 on land acquired by Pennylvannia Loyalist William Marr in 1809; now daycare facility
 28 Pike Lane - Peter Pike House c. 1880
 28 Milroy Lane - replica of 1860 Anthony Forster House c. 2001
 1 Kalvinister Drive - John Reesor House c. 1840
 6881 Highway 7 East c. 1900 - Lewis J. Burkholder House; unrestored
 7323 Highway 7 East - Frank Albert Reesor House c. 1922; barn demolished 2021 and awaiting restoration 
 7265 Highway 7 East - Abraham  Reesor Farmhouse c. 1875; awaiting restoration

Community description
Most of the houses are townhomes, semi-detached, or detached houses with garages at the rear. The communities are built with central amenities in order to contain suburban sprawl.  Cornell was seen by the Markham Town Council as a way to deter the ongoing sprawl by encouraging residential density. The community, particularly Cornell Village, is designed as a walkable neighborhood with a variety of housing types and retail. Cornell Village, between Highway 7 and 16th Avenue, is fully populated with medium density residential. The southern section of Cornell (south of Highway 7), however, is not populated, and remains as a wild field and a farm. In 2012, the City of Markham completed Fire Station 99 to serve the area.

Demography
Cornell is a diverse community.

Subdivisions within Cornell
Cornell can be further separated by development phases:

 Grand Cornell - located near Highway 7 and 9th Line and built by builders H&R (renamed as Lindvest), GreenPark and CountryWide
 Upper Cornell - located near 16th Avenue and 9th Line and built by builders Aspen Ridge or Beaverbrook
 Cornell Village - located between 16th Avenue and Highway 7 along 9th Line to Cornell Centre Blvd; built by builders Mattamy or Ballantry
 Cornell Rouge - located east of William Forster Road/Cornell Centre Blvd to Donald Cousens Parkway between 16th Avenue and Highway 7; built by builders of Madison Homes and Forest Hill

The remaining portions of Cornell are still non-agricultural grasslands, but it will slowly disappear with further development.

In 2004 there was a plan to create a residential and retail development called "Cornell Town Centre" along the southern end of Cornell. This plan never materialized and most of the area has since been re-developed as residential homes. The man-made recreational Cornell Lake is now a series of ponds that carries the waters of Little Rouge Creek in Grand Cornell development.

Transportation

Public transit
Cornell Terminal serves Cornell with several York Region Transit, VIVA, and GO Transit routes:

YRT/Viva:
Route 1 Highway 7
Route 2 Milliken (weekends only)
Route 9 Ninth Line
Route 14 14th Avenue
Route 16 16th Avenue
Route 18 Bur Oak
Route 25 Major Mackenzie
Route 522 Markham Community
Viva Purple

GO Transit:
Route 52 Oshawa - Hwy 407 Bus Terminal
Route 56 Oshawa - Oakville

The plans for the new terminal include connections with Durham Region Transit.

YRT Route 303 Bur Oak Express also provides an express service connecting Cornell to Finch Bus Terminal, bypassing Cornell Terminal.

Road
Major roads and highways in the community include:

Arterial roads

  16th Avenue runs east-west on the northside of Cornell.
  9th Line runs north-south on the west side of Cornell.
  Donald Cousens Parkway runs north-south on the east side of Cornell.
 Highway 7 is an east-west road that cuts through the centre of Cornell from Donald Cousens Parkway to Ninth Line. It is a regional road from Ninth Line and east of Donald Cousens Parkway.

Secondary roads

Cornell Centre Boulevard

Cornell Centre Boulevard is a secondary road in the east side of Cornell that runs north-south from Highway 7 to 16th Avenue to divert traffic from Highway 48. Formerly known as Markham Bypass and renamed in 2004. The section south of Shady Oaks Avenue to Highway 7 will be closed to be re-routed  and connected as part of the existing William Forster Road. The northern section from Shady Oaks will remain and likely become part of Church Street. Small signage has been added referring to this road as Old Markham By-Pass

Bur Oak Avenue

Bur Oak Avenue is a secondary road in the north side of Cornell mainly north-south and curves around north of 16th Avenue to Ninth Line.

Highways
 Ontario Highway 407 is an east-west highway on the southern boundary of Cornell with two exits (Donald Cousens and Ninth Line)

The above roads are heavily travelled by commuters during the weekdays to get around Markham, York Region and down to Toronto.

Parks and recreation

 Cornell Village Park is community park located next to Cornell Village PS
 Donald Cousens Parkway North Berm and Flatlands - naturalized area on the northeast corner of Ninth Line and Donald Cousens Parkway in Upper Cornell.
 Grand Cornell Park - features clock tower and bell commemorating the Reesor settlers in the area; park is unfinished due to stoppage of development east of the Little Rouge Creek
 Oakmoor Pond - man made marshes that drains Little Rouge River
 New Union Park - renamed and signs installed after local veteran McCowan Freeman in 2017
 Burkholder Parkette
 Shania Johnstone Parkette

A number of smaller parks dot the area and do not have any names. City owned parks are maintained by parks staff year round.

Cornell Community Centre

Cornell Community Centre features a library, community rooms and an indoor swimming pool

Planned development

 Lindvest Condo and Retail Development - 1,300 condo units, 50 live/work and commercial/retail/office space located on the South side of Highway 7. A small park will be located at the corner of Highway 7 and Ninth Line.
 Jade Garden at Cornell.

Education
 Cornell Village P.S: accepts students mostly from Cornell.
 Little Rouge P.S: located in Cornell North. Students living in Grand Cornell, Cornell Rouge, Cornell and Upper Cornell and students from the farmlands northeast of Markham attend Little Rouge Public School.
 Black Walnut P.S: The significance of the school's name is from the fact that Black Walnut trees grow best in deep, fertile soil. When settlers came to Markham, more than two centuries ago, they saw Black Walnut trees growing. They knew this was a good sign that they had found an area that would be good for farming. More than 65 German Pennsylvanian families, many of them Mennonites, came to Southern York Region because of, indirectly, the Black Walnut.
 St. Joseph C.P.S. - opened in 2015
 Bill Hogarth Secondary School - opened in September 2017 with a secondary French Immersion program serving east Markham and Whitchurch-Stouffville, located on Bur Oak Avenue near Cornell Community Centre.
 The York Region Catholic School Board has a site reserved for a secondary school.

See also
 Thomson Memorial Park - home to Charles Cornell House] built by Charles Cornell, a descendant of William Cornell in 1858 (relocated from Markham Road)

References

Neighbourhoods in Markham, Ontario
New Urbanism communities
Planned communities in Canada
Cornell family